Khosuyeh (also Romanized as Khosūyeh; also known as Khusu) is a village in Khosuyeh Rural District, in the Central District of Zarrin Dasht County, Fars Province, Iran. At the 2006 census, its population was 2,793, in 630 families.

References 

Populated places in Zarrin Dasht County